Autotoky is uniparental reproduction by self-fertilization or by parthenogenesis. The word comes from the Greek words auto meaning self and tokos meaning birth.

References 

Asexual reproduction
Reproduction